Alexey Fernandes Falcone (born 3 August 1990, in São Bernardo do Campo) is a Brazilian futsal player. He plays as a goalkeeper for Giti Pasand. People usually call him (Alê Falcone).

He started futsal with Augusta 1986, then he played for some Brazilian clubs such as Carlos Barbosa and Palmeiras. He joined to Giti Pasand in September of 2018. He made his debut against Hyper Shahr Shahin Shahr on 31 October 2018. He caught a penalty in that match.

Honours
Winner the Liga Nacional de Futsal with Carlos Barbosa in 2015.

References

1990 births
Living people
Brazilian men's futsal players
Futsal goalkeepers
Giti Pasand FSC players
People from São Bernardo do Campo
Footballers from São Paulo (state)